Mit Abu El Kom is a village in the Egyptian Nile Delta and the Monufia Governorate. It is the birthplace of Egyptian President Anwar Sadat (1918–1981), and his childhood home has been made into a museum.

See also

 List of cities and towns in Egypt

References

External links
 

Populated places in Monufia Governorate
Villages in Egypt